Going for Gold is a British television game show that originally aired on BBC1 between 12 October 1987 and 9 July 1996. It was revived for Channel 5 from 13 October 2008 to 20 March 2009.

Background

1987–96
Going for Gold was originally broadcast on BBC1 from 12 October 1987 to 9 July 1996, usually, after the lunchtime broadcast of Australian soap opera Neighbours. It was presented by Irish broadcaster Henry Kelly, and its defining concept was that it featured contestants from different European countries who competed against each other to answer questions (all in English) to win a prize. The show's theme tune was composed by future multi-award winning composer Hans Zimmer.
The show was shown on BBC1 in the UK and on Super Channel (later NBC Super Channel) in Continental Europe and on BBC TV Europe (which carried a mix of BBC1 and BBC2 output up to its dissolution in early 1991).

The 1987–1996 run of the quiz show each week had seven contestants that spoke English (each representing a different European country, although each of the home nations of the United Kingdom fielded their own contestants) who would compete against each other for a place in the finals. The show followed a repechage format (now common, but was unusual then), whereby unsuccessful contestants from Monday's show would return on Tuesday, and so on throughout the week. Each episode lasted for 25 minutes, including four rounds.

There were ten series in total (two in 1992). The first five series were broadcast during the winter, and many of these were split in half by the Christmas break. The (second) 1992 and 1993 series went out in the autumn, the last three were broadcast during the summer. The 1996 series featured competitors from the United Kingdom only and was moved to an earlier time slot, immediately before the 1.00 pm news.

While the show didn’t award a winners trophy, David Baddiel had one despite not even appearing on the show. He offered this up for the prize task on Taskmaster series nine, which won him 5 points.

2008–09
The show was revived and produced by Talkback Thames and aired on Channel 5, premiering from 13 October to 19 December 2008. The new version featured only contestants from the UK and Ireland, was broadcast live and hosted by newsreader John Suchet. Former ITV Play host Alex Kramer, did the newly introduced viewers' phone-in question section from 17 November 2008 until 20 March 2009, repeating the questions several times and talking to the selected phone-in contestant. The set questions involve many clues to an item or person, and the phone-ins were notorious for taking up significant amounts of time during the show.

The show continued its run between 5 January and 20 March 2009. Vicky Letch temporarily replaced Alex Kramer as the viewer's phone-in host whilst Alex was on holiday. When John Suchet was unavailable, the programme was hosted by Dean Wilson. At the end of the series, the sixteen winners with the most daily wins contested four semi-finals, the winners of which competed in the series final on 20 March 2009, won by Iwan Thomas.

Format

Elimination round (Round 1)
Each edition began with a short general knowledge round to all seven contestants. Out of the contestants who started the show, four would go through to the next round (always referred to as the "first round proper" by Kelly). These four would be the first who managed to answer each of the four general knowledge questions correctly. These questions would usually take the form of a 20 to 30-second description of an object, person, animal or place (usually beginning "Who am I?", "What am I?", etc.), with progressively more details being revealed by Kelly until someone was able to identify it. By the Thursday show, there would be only four contestants left to play the opening round and so several questions were asked and the first person to two points would join the previous days' winners in "the first round proper".

This round was not played in the 2008 version.

Beat the Buzzer (Round 2)
The Beat the Buzzer round was a general knowledge round, played with hands on plungers. Questions were worth one, two or three points. Beginning with a general knowledge question worth one point, a contestant who gave a correct answer would be told the subject of the next question, and got to choose the value to play for. If nobody answered correctly, it restarted with another general knowledge question worth one point. The first three players to reach six points, or nine in the 2008 version, went on to play the next round.

If a contestant buzzed in and got a question wrong, the question would be offered to other contestants, signalled by a buzzer sounding. But a contestant buzzing in and giving no answer at all would result in a doorbell sound and the answer was revealed.

Four in a Row (Round 3)
In this round, each of the remaining contestants were asked to pick a category (out of a choice of four). The order in which they picked the categories was based on the order in which they progressed from the previous round. Each would then have to answer questions on their chosen category for 40 seconds.

Players scored based on the number of consecutive questions they got right – if an incorrect answer was given, their score returned to zero. The score taken from this round was the highest point reached over 40 seconds. After this round, the two highest scoring players went through to the final round. A "first to two" general knowledge playoff was held if there was a tie, using the same style of questions from round 1.

Head to Head (Round 4)
In the final, every question was worth between four and one point depending on how quickly they were answered. Again, the questions pertained to a famous person, place, thing, fictional character or event. However, only one player at a time was allowed to the buzzer, as indicated by a timer graphic running down the center of the screen. If a player gave an incorrect answer, their section of the time was passed over to their opponent and the time (and the question) continued; in the event that a contestant was passed control of a zone and also gave an incorrect answer in the same segment of time, then the next lower segment was also passed over to their opponent.

In the original, the first player to score nine points won the game. While in the 2008 revival, this round kept on playing until time was up. When time was up, the player with the most points won £1,000 and competed against three new players on the next programme.

Progression to the finals
The first player to reach nine points in this round won the daily game, and went through to the end of week final (an automatic place in the 'first round proper' on Thursday), from where, the winner progressed to the later stages of the series. The losing players all came back the next day, starting with the same pool of players each weekday, minus the winner of the week's earlier shows.  The weekly final had the four daily winners directly through to Beat the Buzzer with the final spot decided in the Elimination Round where the first to answer two questions correctly progressed.  The winner of the weekly final advanced to one of two Semi-Final weeks.

The Semi-Final weeks occurred at the end of each half of the season with between 7–10 weekly winners (depending upon season length).  Each week was made up of four daily heats with the winner of each heat advancing to Finals week and the losing players returning each day (there was no weekly final).  By this point the contestants were buzzing in noticeably earlier as the standard of competition increased.

The Finals week consisted of eight winners from the Semi-Finals (four from each week) competing in a standard week format of three daily heats with the winners advancing to the Grand Final (directly to the Beat the Buzzer round).  The Grand Final episode would start with a "First-to-Two" Elimination Round amongst the remaining five contestants and play as normal to the Head to Head where the winner would receive the star prize holiday (as described in every episode) and the runner-up would get a consolation prize (e.g. a colour television, or a gold-plated Going for Gold plate).

The 2008 revival added a Finals week inviting back sixteen contestants from the series (all winners of the international special episodes and contestants with the most daily wins).  This week consisted of four daily heats with the winners earning £1,000 and advancing to the Grand Final episode where that week's prize money was rolled up to award £5,000 to the champion.  All shows ran using the normal format for that series.

Transmissions

BBC1

Channel 5

International versions
Going for Gold began its life as an American pilot, Run for the Money, hosted by Bill Rafferty and produced for ABC in 1987, at ABC Television Center. The pilot did not sell in the States; however, Grundy took it to Europe where it became what is now Going for Gold. Run for the Money would have been played with four contestants (one a returning champion) starting with the Beat the Buzzer round. The winner of each episode received $5,000, and any contestant who won five consecutive games retired undefeated and had their winnings increased to $50,000. Another American pilot was called American Know-it-All, hosted by Neil Patrick Harris in 2008.

The programme has been adapted in France, where it became a very famous game show Questions pour un champion, which still airs today on France 3, is hosted by Samuel Étienne since February 2016, replacing long-time fixture Julien Lepers (November 1988 – February 2016).

The Channel 5 quiz One to Win was a half-hour show whose format was effectively based on the latter three rounds of Going for Gold, repackaged and with a different host (initially, Paul Roseby, who was soon replaced by Robin Houston, known as the 'voice of the computer' on another Channel 5 quiz show, 100%). Unlike Going for Gold but like 100%, One to Win featured low cash prizes for the first player to reach 21 points in the head-to-head round – just £200 per episode but with a bonus for five consecutive wins – and offered its champions the option to return on the next edition of the show.

References

External links

1987 British television series debuts
2009 British television series endings
1980s British game shows
1990s British game shows
2000s British game shows
BBC television game shows
British television series revived after cancellation
Channel 5 (British TV channel) original programming
English-language television shows
Lost BBC episodes
Television series by Fremantle (company)
Television series by Reg Grundy Productions
Television shows scored by Hans Zimmer
Television shows shot at BBC Elstree Centre